Sidney High School or Sidney School is a public primary, intermediate and highschool located in Sidney, Texas (USA) and classified as a 1A school by the UIL. It is part of the Sidney Independent School District located in Comanche County. In 2015, the school was rated "Met Standard" by the Texas Education Agency.

Athletics
The Sidney Eagles compete in the following sports:

 Basketball
 Cross Country
 Six Man Football
 Golf
 Powerlifting
 Tennis
 Track & Field

References

External links
Sidney ISD

Public high schools in Texas
Education in Comanche County, Texas